Rathinirvedam may refer to:

Rathinirvedam, a short novel by P. Padmarajan 
Rathinirvedam, Malayalam film released in 1978 starring Jayabharathi and Krishnachandran
Rathinirvedam, Malayalam film released in 2011 starring Shwetha Menon and Sreejith Vijay